West Central Valley Community School District is a rural public school district headquartered in Stuart, Iowa. The district is located in sections of Adair, Dallas, and Guthrie counties. It serves Stuart, Dexter, Menlo, and Redfield.

The district was established on July 1, 2001, by the merger of the Dexfield Community School District and the Stuart-Menlo Community School District. The two districts previously had a grade-sharing arrangement in which students from one district attended the other district's schools for certain grade levels. In 2003 the district had 950 students.

From 2002 to 2004, several votes for bonds to finance a new high school were voted down. All four major communities opposed the first, and in the second, of the four communities, only those in Stuart had a majority for supporting the bond. In 2004, the district board attempted to expel Redfield as that community's residents voted against school bonds each time.

Schools
 West Central Valley High School (Stuart)
 West Central Valley Middle School (Redfield)
 Dexter Elementary School (Dexter)
 Stuart Elementary School (Stuart)

West Central Valley High School

Athletics
The Wildcats compete in the West Central Activities Conference in the following sports:
Cross Country
Volleyball
Football
Basketball
Wrestling
Track and Field
Golf 
Soccer
Baseball
Softball

See also
List of school districts in Iowa
List of high schools in Iowa

References

External links
 West Central Valley Community School District
 
 
 District map

School districts in Iowa
Education in Adair County, Iowa
Education in Dallas County, Iowa
Education in Guthrie County, Iowa
2001 establishments in Iowa
School districts established in 2001